Rodrigo Martins Josviaki (born 16 February 1995), or simply Rodrigo Josviaki, is a Brazilian professional footballer who plays as a goalkeeper for Hegelmann.

Honours

Stumbras
Lithuanian Football Cup: 2017

Remo
Copa Verde: 2021

References

External links
 Rodrigo Josviaki at playmakerstats.com (English version of ogol.com.br)

1995 births
Living people
Brazilian footballers
FC Stumbras players
U.D. Vilafranquense players
Clube do Remo players
FC Hegelmann players
Association football goalkeepers
People from Ponta Grossa
Sportspeople from Paraná (state)
Brazilian expatriate footballers
Expatriate footballers in Lithuania
Brazilian expatriate sportspeople in Lithuania